Elections in the Union Territory of Jammu and Kashmir are conducted in accordance with the Constitution of India to elect the representatives of various bodies at national, state and district levels including the 114 seat (90 seats + 24 seats reserved for "PoK") unicameral Jammu and Kashmir Legislative Assembly and the Parliament of India. The first elections in the Union Territory of Jammu and Kashmir took place between 28 November and 19 December 2020 in the form of by-elections to District Development Councils and municipal and panchayat level bodies. A fresh delimitation process for assembly constituencies began in February-March 2020. 

Prior to 2019, the State of Jammu and Kashmir included elections to the Parliament of India, both houses of the bicameral state legislature, and various other local level bodies such as municipalities and Panchayat constituencies. There were 87 assembly constituencies and 6 Lok sabha constituencies (parliamentary constituencies) including those of Ladakh. 

Legislative assembly elections in the state have been held 11 times since 1951 whereas Parliamentary elections have been held 12 times since 1967. Municipal elections in the state have been held four times since 1947, with the October 2018 elections being the fifth time they were held. Before becoming a state, Praja Sabha were held, with the first Praja Sabha election in 1934.

Prior to 2019, Jammu and Kashmir National Conference (JKNC), Jammu & Kashmir People's Democratic Party (PDP) and Indian National Congress (INC) have been the dominant political parties in the state of Jammu and Kashmir. But from 1996 onwards the vote share of Bharatiya Janata Party has increased in the parliamentary elections for the state, from 12.45% in 2008 to 23% in 2014.

Background

Princely state of Jammu and Kashmir electoral system 

In 1932, a Franchise Committee was set up to frame those who would vote as adult suffrage was considered impractical and unfeasible. The committee fixed the minimum voting age at 21 years. For women voters it was decided that those women who had passed middle school or higher could vote, while for males the criteria were broader and included village officials, religious representatives, retired or pensioned officers, lawyers, doctors, schoolmasters etc. were given franchise. Only a state subject would qualify to vote and British Indians were not allowed. In general, the measure of qualification to vote was the possession of property. Those grazing livestock were also enfranchised. For those standing the election the minimum age was 25 years of age and would include only those who were literate in Urdu.

The services of Ivo Elliot, a retired Indian Civil Services officer, were utilized from 1933 onwards. Under him the princely state was  delimited, the election method was set up, and the population was made aware of the electoral process. He divided the territory into 33 constituencies. 138 polling stations for rural constituencies were set up, 32 in Srinagar and 6 in Jammu. 76 nominations were received. Coloured box or symbol system as suggested by the Lothian Committee in British India was utilized.

The Praja Sabha (the Legislative Assembly at the time) was to have 75 members, of which 33 would be elected members (for the 33 constituencies), 12 would be officials, and 30 nominated members. (14 members were nominated as it was not possible to conduct elections in some places such as Ladakh and Gilgit due to the territorial expanse; and the remaining 16 would be nominated as State Councilors). In effect, the elected members chosen through the popular vote would be in the minority in the Legislative Assembly.

State of Jammu and Kashmir electoral system 

The Constitution of India gives power to the Election Commission of India to oversee the establishment of the electoral roles as well as organize the elections to both the Legislative Assembly and Legislative Council in Jammu and Kashmir.

Delimitation has taken place in the state in 1963, 1973 and 1995. The last delimitation in 1995 was based on the 1981 census. Following the 1995 delimitation the number of seats was increased from 76 to 87 (and an additional 24 seats reserved for areas under Pakistan).

Elections to elect all the 111 members of the Legislative Assembly is based universal adult suffrage from people among the state constituencies. The Legislative Council (Vidhan Parishad) of Jammu and Kashmir has 36 members. Out of these 22 members are elected according to a "system of proportional representation by means of the single transferable vote", 6 members are elected from among members municipal council, town area committees, notified area committees, Panchayats and other bodies.

Panchayat elections which are held for sarpanch and panch constituencies as part of the Panchayati Raj system in the state are held according to the provisions in the Jammu and Kashmir Panchayati Raj Act 1989. The authority to form the 'Panchayat Electoral Rolls' and to the conduct Panchayat elections are given to the Chief Electoral Officer, Jammu and Kashmir. Municipal elections in Jammu and Kashmir are conducted on the basis of the Jammu and Kashmir Municipal Act 2000.

Union territory of Jammu and Kashmir electoral system 

A new delimitation process for the assembly constituencies of the Union Territory began in February-March 2020. The COVID-19 pandemic in India as well as political participation issues delayed the progress. On 24 June 2021, Prime Minister Modi met with political leaders from the region signaling a renewed effort with the delimitation process. The Delimitation Commission is chaired by retired Supreme Court of India Justice Ranjana Prakash Desai. The delimitation is based on the 2011 census of India and is being undertaken as per the amended Delimitation Act, 2002 and the Jammu and Kashmir Reorganisation Act, 2019. There are 280 District Development Council (DDC) seats in the union territory equally divided between the Jammu and Kashmir regions. In each of the 20 districts of the union territory there are 14 constituencies.

Major political parties 

This list includes state parties as well as national parties. It also includes political parties which no longer exist:

National parties 
 BJP: Bharatiya Janata Party
 BSP: Bahujan Samaj Party
 CPI: Communist Party of India
 CPM: Communist Party of India (Marxist)
 INC: Indian National Congress
 NCP: Nationalist Congress Party

State parties of Jammu and Kashmir 
 JKNC: Jammu & Kashmir National Conference, founded 1932
 PDP: Jammu & Kashmir People's Democratic Party, split from INC in 1998
 JKAP: Jammu and Kashmir Apni Party, formed in 2020 and led by Altaf Bukhari
 JKNPP: Jammu and Kashmir National Panthers Party, formed in 1982
 JKPC: Jammu and Kashmir People's Conference, founded in 1978
 JKPM: Jammu & Kashmir People's Movement,  formed 2019
 JKWP: Jammu and Kashmir Workers Party, formed in 2020 and led by Mir Junaid
 Ikkjutt Jammu, formed in 2020 and led by Ankur Sharma

Alliances 
PAGD: People's Alliance for Gupkar Declaration, founded 2020

Other 
 MC: All Jammu and Kashmir Muslim Conference, founded in 1932, renamed JKNC in 1939
 PC: Jammu & Kashmir Political Conference, separated from JKNC in 1947
 PF: Jammu & Kashmir Plebiscite Front, founded in 1955, renamed as JKNC in 1977
 Jamaat: Jamaat-e-Islami Kashmir, formed soon after 1947, contested elections since 1972 (under the MUF umbrella in 1987)
 MUF: Muslim United Front, a coalition of Islamic groups (Jamaat-e-Islami, Ummat-e-Islami, Anjunmane Ittehad-ul-Musalmeen) that contested elections in 1987

Lok Sabha elections 

The state of Jammu and Kashmir has taken part in 12 general elections to the Lok Sabha of India. The first time that Jammu & Kashmir sent elected members to the Lok Sabha was in 1967. Elections were not held in 1990 in Jammu and Kashmir due to insurgency in the region.

The table below shows how the Indian National Congress (INC) and Jammu and Kashmir National Conference (JKNC) have won the most Lok Seats in the state since 1967. JKNC and INC has won the seats 27 times each. The other parties won seats in general elections to the Lok Sabha from Jammu and Kashmir are Jammu & Kashmir People's Democratic Party 4 times, Bharatiya Janata Party 13 times, Janata Dal only 1 time and independent candidates 6 times.

Legislative assembly elections 

After the Constitution of Jammu and Kashmir was amended, the name Prime Minister of Jammu and Kashmir changed into Chief Minister of Jammu and Kashmir.

Municipal elections in Jammu and Kashmir 
Municipal elections in Jammu and Kashmir are held for positions to municipal corporations (Urban Local Bodies - ULBs) in the region on the basis of the Jammu and Kashmir Municipal Act 2000. Elections to these positions are based on universal adult franchise in electoral constituencies called wards. Since 1947 municipal elections have been held five times in the state. Before 2018, the last Municipal elections in Jammu and Kashmir were held in 2005.

2018 municipal elections 
The 2018 local elections were held in the state of Jammu and Kashmir in four phases on 8, 10, 13 and 16 October. Voting was held from 7am to 4pm. The days were declared a public holiday in the region. The total number of wards (electoral constituencies) were 1145 out of which 244 wards (4.7%) were uncontested. Out of a total of around 17 lakh electors, the final state voter turnout was 35.1%, that is 5.97 lakh electors voted. Counting was held on 20 October 2018. Major political parties in the state such as Jammu and Kashmir National Conference (JKNC) and Jammu and Kashmir People's Democratic Party (PDP) boycotted the elections.

There was vast difference between voting turnout for the Urban Local Bodies, with Srinagar Municipal Corporation getting a poll percentage of 1.8% as compared to Ramgarh Municipal Committee getting a poll percentage of 82.6% in the third phase of voting. In certain wards such as Baghat Barzulla (Srinagar Municipal Corporation), out of a total of 11486 electors, only 61 votes were placed (0.53% voter turnout). On the other hand, wards such as Partap Garh (Jammu Municipal Corporation), out of 3583 electors, 2372 votes were placed (66.2% voter turnout).

In the Srinagar Municipal Corporation, out of the 74 wards, Independent candidates won 53 seats, Indian National Congress won 16 seats, Bhartiya Janata Party secured 4 seats and 1 ward went vacant ( no votes were cast on that seat ). In the Jammu Municipal Corporation polls, out of the 75 wards, Bhartiya Janata Party secured 43 seats, Independent candidates got 18 seats and Indian National Congress won 14 seats. In the Leh municipal committee, Congress won all the 13 seats. BJP for the first time in the electoral history of the state, won 60 seats unopposed, winning at least seven municipal committees in Kashmir valley. In Kashmir, 69% of the 598 wards did not require polling.

Panchayat elections in Jammu and Kashmir 
Jammu and Kashmir Panchayat elections are held in accordance with the provisions of the Jammu and Kashmir Panchayati Raj Act 1989.

The 2011 the Panchayat elections consisted of 143 blocks, 4130 Sarpanchs and 29719 Panchs. The total electors were 5,068,975 electors out of which over 80% voted in 33,000 polling stations. Before 2011, panchayat elections were held in 2001 after a gap of 23 years.

2018 Panchayat elections 
In the run-up to the 2018 Panchayat elections, National Conference (NC) and People's Democratic Party (PDP) announced they would boycott the local elections. Around 12 panchayat houses were set on fire before the elections.

2020 District Development Councils elections 
District Development Council elections the Union Territory of Jammu and Kashmir took place between 28 November and 19 December along with by-elections for other vacant posts in local bodies. A total of 1,475 candidates contested 280 DDC seats; 296 candidates were women. Ballot papers were being used for the elections instead of EVMs. Results were announced on 22 December 2020.

24 seats in legislative assembly not contested 
The Constitution of Jammu and Kashmir reserved 24 seats in the legislative assembly for areas in Pakistan-occupied-Kashmir that were not to be contested during elections "until the area of the State under the occupation of Pakistan ceases to be so occupied and the people residing in that area elect their representatives". In 2019, the Government of India retained these provisions during the formation of the Union Territory.

Administration 
Hirdesh Kumar is the current chief electoral officer of Jammu and Kashmir.

Controversies 

Election controversies include burning prospective buildings going to be used for elections, such as what happened before the 2018 Panchayat elections in the state. The call to boycott the elections is a common feature among parties in the region, especially the regional parties and separatist groups. Election rigging has also been a criticism, especially during the 1987 Jammu and Kashmir Legislative Assembly election.

See also
Politics of Jammu and Kashmir
Mayor of Srinagar

References

Bibliography 
 
 
 

 
Election Commission of India, Statistical Reports of General Election to Lok Sabha. Government of India
National Informatics Centre. Constitution of Jammu and Kashmir 1956 , Government of India

Further reading 

 Jammu and Kashmir Conduct of Election Rules, 1965
 Jammu and Kashmir Representation of the People Act, 1957

External links